is Japanese singer Ringo Sheena's 3rd single and it was released on January 20, 1999, by Toshiba EMI, East World. It was certified gold twice by the RIAJ: Once in 1999 for 200,000 physical copies shipped, and once in 2011 for 100,000 paid downloads to cellphones.

Background 
There are two music videos of Koko de Kiss Shite., and the video which she and her band members performed in the rose garden was adopted officially. The literal translation of song titles is slightly different from the official English title.

It was the theme song for Koko de Kiss Shite, a drama produced for NTV's Shin-D series of dramas from March 2 to April 27, 1999. The song was also used as a theme song for the variety show Downtown DX. The song was covered as a part of a medley by Rie Tomosaka on the television show The Yoru mo Hippare on September 9, 2000. It was covered again by Tsuyoshi Domoto of KinKi Kids on their Fuji TV variety show Shin-Domoto Kyodai on July 3, 2005, and by D.H.Y (Dogs Holiday of Yawn) on their cover album Loves (2006).

Track listing

Chart rankings

Sales and certifications

Credits and personnel 
Koko de Kiss Shite.
 
 Vocals: Ringo Sheena
 Guitars: Susumu Nishikawa
 Bass guitars: Seiji Kameda
 Drums: Noriyasu "Kāsuke" Kawamura
 Synthesizer Operator: Hiroshi Kitashiro
 Guest Player
 Electronic Organ: Tsunehiko Yashiro

Memai
 Vocals, Piano: Ringo Sheena
 Guitars: Susumu Nishikawa
 Bass guitars: Seiji Kameda
 Synthesizer Operator: Hiroshi Kitashiro

Remote Controller
 Vocals, Harpsichord: Ringo Sheena
 Guitars: Susumu Nishikawa
 Bass guitars: Seiji Kameda
 Drums: Noriyasu "Kāsuke" Kawamura
 Synthesizer Operator: Hiroshi Kitashiro

Music video cast 
Koko de Kiss Shite.
 Vocal & Rhythm guitar: Ringo Sheena
 Lead guitar: Akihito Suzuki (from Heart Bazaar)
 Bass guitar: Masatoshi Asauchi (from Farmstay, Kera & The Synthesizers)
 Drums: Hisashi Nishikawa (he is Shiina's friend and is an amateur)

References 

Ringo Sheena songs
1999 songs
1999 singles
Song recordings produced by Seiji Kameda
Songs written by Ringo Sheena